Tanimowo Ogunlesi (1908–2002) was a Nigerian women's rights activist and the leader of the Women's Improvement League. She was one of the leading women activists of her era and co-founded the National Council of Women Societies, the country's leading women's rights organization.

Life
Tanimowo Ogunlesi was born on 1 December 1908, she attended Kudeti Girls School Ibadan, Oyo State and attended United Missionary College (UMC) for her teachers training qualifications. Tanimowo Ogunlesi started teaching in Lagos at CMS Girls’ Seminary School in 1934. she was married to her husband J.S. Ogunlesi, who was also a teacher in 1934.J.S Ogunlesi her husband received a scholarship to study in London which gave her opportunities for her to relocate to London too, and continued her education at the nursery school in St. Andrew’s University in Scotland, in 1946. Tanimowo and her husband returned back to Nigeria in 1947, after her husband was appointed as the Adult Education Officer of the Western Region. She was the first person to establish an elementary boarding school in Ibadan (Children Home School) in 1948.

She became the first president of the National Council of Women Societies in 1959. She dealt largely on the rights of women to vote and to have access to educational facilities but like most women nationalists of the era, she never really questioned the male dominance of the Nigerian household. She was part of a movement to increase domestic science training in Nigeria when she opened a home training school.

References

Yoruba women activists
Nigerian women's rights activists
Nigerian women in politics
Nigerian women activists
Nigerian suffragists
Yoruba women in politics
History of women in Nigeria
20th-century Nigerian women
Founders of Nigerian schools and colleges
Nigerian women educators
Yoruba women educators
St Anne's School, Ibadan alumni
1908 births
2002 deaths
People from colonial Nigeria